The Hunan University of Technology and Business (HUTB) is a provincial public university located at Changsha, Hunan, China.

As of 2022, Hunan University of Technology and Business ranked the best in Hunan and 28th nationwide among universities specialized in finance, business, and economics in the recent edition of the recognized Best Chinese Universities Ranking.

History 
HUC was established in 1949 by combining two colleges: Hunan Business College and Hunan Business Management College. It was renamed Hunan University of Commerce in 2007. 

HUC has by now been developed into a multi-disciplinary and multi-level college, including four-year education, three-year education and adult education. In 2008, HUC started to grant Master's degrees. It consists of 17 teaching units in the forms of schools or departments and 18 research institutes. Currently 26 bachelor's degree programs are offered and over 11,000 full-time and part-time students are enrolled on campus.

Rankings 
As of 2022, Hunan University of Technology and Business ranked the best in Hunan and 28th nationwide among universities specialized in finance, business, and economics in the recent edition of the recognized Best Chinese Universities Ranking. Hunan University of Technology and Business ranked # 2559 in the world out of nearly 30,000 universities worldwide by the University Ranking by Academic Performance 2021-2022.

School and departments 
School and departments
Economy and Trade Development Research Center
Beijin School
School of Finance
School of Law
School of Business Management
School of Public Management
School of Accounting
School of Computer and Electronic Engineering
School of continuing education
School of Economy and Trade
School of Tourism Management
School of Arts Design
Department of Physical Education
School of Foreign Languages
School of Information
School of Chinese Language and Literature
School of International Studies

References

External links

Universities and colleges in Hunan
Universities and colleges in Changsha
Yuelu District